Hylarana leptoglossa, commonly known as the long-tongued frog, is a species of true frog in the genus Hylarana. It is native to Bangladesh, northeastern India, Myanmar, and western Thailand. It is also known under the common names Cope's frog, Cope's Assam frog, palebrown small frog,  and Assam forest frog. It has recently been reported also from Bhutan.

Hylarana leptoglossa live near streams in evergreen forests. Deforestation, fires, and agricultural encroachment can pose threats to this species.

References

leptoglossa
Amphibians of Bangladesh
Amphibians of Bhutan
Amphibians of Myanmar
Frogs of India
Amphibians of Thailand
Amphibians described in 1868
Taxobox binomials not recognized by IUCN